Raúl Aldana Solís (born April 17, 1966) is a Mexican voice actor. Besides being one of the original Spanish Robotech voice actors, he was also the voice of Will Turner in Disney's Pirates of the Caribbean trilogy. He was the creative manager of Disney Character Voices from 1997 to 2004, he then became the creative director for the division from 2005 to 2018. His final project with Disney brought 32 leading stars to the Spanish version of Coco, which has since become Mexico’s top-grossing film of all time. In 2018, Raul joined ZOO Digital Group as Creative Director and Dubbing Producer for Latin American dubbing projects

Filmography
Kermit the Frog/Rizzo the Rat/Scooter/Constantine in Muppets 2: Los mas buscados (2014)
Kermit The Frog/Scooter in Los Muppets (2011)
Guido in Cars 2 (2011)
Tron/Rinzler in Tron: El Legado (2010)
Lord Wingus Eternus in La Isla de Mutantes
Timon in Una Navidad con Mickey (2001)
Yoshi in Appleseed Ex Machina (2007)
Will Turner in Piratas del Caribe: En el Fin del Mundo (2007)
Will Turner in Piratas del Caribe: El Cofre de la Muerte (2006)
Guido in Cars (2006)
Yoshi in Appleseed (2005)
Kermit The Frog/Rizzo the Rat/Johnny Fiama/Scooter in Los Muppets y el Mago de Oz (2005)
Timon in El Rey León 3 (2004)
Timon in El Show del Ratón (2001-2003)
Will Turner in Piratas del Caribe: La Maldición del Perla Negra (2003)
Kermit The Frog/Rizzo the Rat in Los Muppets en el espacio (1999)
Timon in El Rey León 2: El Reino de Simba (1998)
 Kermit the Frog/Rizzo the Rat in Los Muppets en la isla del tesoro (1996) 
Jinsaku Ajo in Key the Metal Idol (1994)
Timon in Timon y Pumbaa (1995-1999)
Timon in El Rey León (1994)
Zangief in Street Fighter II: La Película (1994)
Rick in Zillion: Burning Night (1993)
David Herdeg in The Philadelphia Experiment II (1993)
Yo Hinomura/Crying Freeman/Ron Tayan in Crying Freeman (1993–2003)
 Kermit the Frog/Rizzo the Rat in Una Navidad con los Muppets (1992) 
Shin in El Puño de la Estrella del Norte (1991)
Eddie Wilson in Eddie and the Cruisers II: Eddie Lives! (1989)
Shin in El Puño de la Estrella del Norte (1988–1990)
Max Sterling in Robotech (1985)
David Herdeg in The Philadelphia Experiment (1984)
Eddie Wilson in Eddie and the Cruisers (1983)
Alan Bradley/Tron in Tron (1982)
The Nazz in Kitty Is Not a Cat

References

1966 births
Living people
Mexican male voice actors
20th-century Mexican male actors
21st-century Mexican male actors